Liao Chun-chiang (born 12 January 1973) is a Taiwanese judoka. He competed in the men's extra-lightweight event at the 1996 Summer Olympics.

References

1973 births
Living people
Taiwanese male judoka
Olympic judoka of Taiwan
Judoka at the 1996 Summer Olympics
Place of birth missing (living people)